Reggie Stoltzfus (born September 15, 1980) is an American politician who has served in the Ohio House of Representatives from the 50th district since 2019.

References 

1980 births
Living people
Republican Party members of the Ohio House of Representatives
People from Hartville, Ohio
21st-century American politicians